The Flag of Kyiv was approved by the Kyiv City Council on 25 May 1995, at the behest of the then head of the Kyiv City Council of People's Deputies Leonid Kosakovsky.

On 27 May 1995, the flag was first raised solemnly above the main entrance to the Kyiv City Council.

The flag of 1995 looks like an azure piece of fabric. The patron Saint of Kyiv Archangel Michael who holds a flaming sword in his right hand and an oval shield with a cross on it in his left, is depicted on the flag. The flag panel has a yellow border.

History 
In 1995 a resolution of the Kyiv City Council (36 deputies voted for) has returned the Coat of arms of Kyiv of the times of Russian Empire — stylised representation of Archangel Michael, and adopted the flag of the city.

The design firms in charge of the new flag first produced designs with the image of the Archangel in G. Kurovsky's variant, and later, for unknown reasons, in the variant of Y. Solominsky.

In March 2009, a working group at the Kyiv City Council drafted a new look for the capital's flag. The Coat of Arms of Kyiv is placed in its center. However, this design has not received further approval.

Description of the flag design

Colour standardisation

See also
 Coat of arms of Kyiv

References

Kyiv
Culture in Kyiv
Michael (archangel)
Kyiv
Kyiv